Sudamerica, literally "South America" in Spanish, is a genus of mammal from the extinct suborder Gondwanatheria that lived in Patagonia, Argentina (Salamanca Formation) and Antarctica (La Meseta Formation) from the Middle Paleocene (Peligran), just after the end of the "Age of Dinosaurs", to the Early Eocene (Casamayoran).

Etymology 
The genus and species were named by Scillato-Yané  and R. Pascual in 1984. The genus is also known by the synonym Sudamericana and the species epithet ameghinoi refers to notable Argentinian paleontologist Florentino Ameghino.

Description 
Similar to Gondwanatherium, this genus had high-crowned teeth, which are very useful for eating grasses. Since there is no evidence of grass in South America until later, they must also have been effective for other types of food.

Classification 
The type specimen of Sudamerica ameghinoi was discovered in Punta Peligro, Argentina in deposits dating to the Lower Paleocene period. In 1999, a near complete lower jaw (dentary) was found.

The position of gondwanatherians within the class Mammalia is not yet clear.

References

Further reading 
 Scillato-Yané, G.J. &  Pascual, R.1985.  Un peculiar Xenarthra del Paleoceno medio de Patagonia (Argentina).  Su importancia en la sistemática de los Paratheria.  Ameghiniana, 21: 316–318.
 Malcolm C. McKenna and Susan K. Bell. (1997) "Classification of Mammals Above the Species Level". Columbia University Press.
 Much of this information has been derived from MESOZOIC MAMMALS: Gondwanatheria, an Internet directory.

Gondwanatheres
Paleocene mammals
Paleogene Antarctica
Fossils of Antarctica
Paleocene mammals of South America
Cenozoic animals of Antarctica
Casamayoran
Riochican
Itaboraian
Peligran
Paleogene Argentina
Fossils of Argentina
Fossil taxa described in 1984
Taxa named by Gustavo Juan Scillato-Yané
Taxa named by Rosendo Pascual
Golfo San Jorge Basin
Salamanca Formation